Wazir Arsala Khan was an early ancestor of the influential Arsala family of Nangarhar Province, Afghanistan.  Wazir Arsala Khan served as Foreign Minister of Afghanistan in 1869.

Wazir Arsala Khan was the great-grandfather of the three Arsala brothers, Abdul Haq, Haji Din Mohammad, and Haji Abdul Qadir, who gained great power in Nangarhar Province during the Soviet-Afghan War, through their ties with Yunus Khalis.

References

Arsala family
Foreign ministers of Afghanistan
Year of birth missing
Year of death missing
Pashtun people
19th-century Afghan politicians